Eugenia taipingensis is a species of plant in the family Myrtaceae. It is endemic to Peninsular Malaysia. It is threatened by habitat loss.

References

taipingensis
Endemic flora of Peninsular Malaysia
Endangered plants
Taxonomy articles created by Polbot